Monsignor Scanlan High School is an American four-year private, Roman Catholic high school located in the Throggs Neck neighborhood of The Bronx, New York City, New York.  It is part of the Roman Catholic Archdiocese of New York and is accredited by the Middle States Association of Colleges and Schools and the Board of Regents of the University of the State of New York.

History
Monsignor Scanlan High School was initially established in 1949 as two schools, St. Helena's High School for Boys and St. Helena's High School for Girls.  Both schools were formed by Monsignor Arthur J. Scanlan, founding pastor of St. Helena's Church. He also founded the parish elementary school in 1940.  Both high schools were renamed in Scanlan's honor in 1972 and merged to form one coeducational high school in 1976.

The parish also operated a commercial high school from 1956 to 2002.

Location 
The school is located on a 13-acre campus in the Throggs Neck neighborhood of The Bronx. Students residing in The Bronx, Queens and Manhattan constitute the majority of the pupil population.  The Q50 and Q44 MTA bus lines accommodate students traveling from different points in Queens and The Bronx. The school is adjacent to Westchester Creek to the west and the Bronx–Whitestone Bridge and Ferry Point Park to the south.

Academics 
The academic program is organized around a seven-day cycle on three academic levels designed to accommodate the scholastic needs of students.

S.T.E.M.
The school offers S.T.E.M. (science, technology 
engineering and mathematics) courses as part of the Amazon Future Engineer Pathway STEM Program in Partnership with Edhesive. Course offerings include: Introduction to 
Computer Coding and Advanced Placement (AP) Computer Science.

Advanced-placement courses 
The school offers two programs for its students to earn college credits:

Advanced-placement courses are offered in:
 biology
 computer-science principles
 English
 Spanish language
 Spanish literature
 United States government and politics
 United States history
 world history

College-level courses 
The school also partners with St. John's University to offer college-level courses to juniors and seniors with an opportunity to obtain college credits.

Campus facilities 
 twenty-six classrooms 
 three science labs
 Mac computer lab
 two gymnasiums 
 workout facility
 baseball and softball fields
 chapel
 one convent

Athletics 
The shool offers competitive athletic programs to its students. It has garnered several city-wide championship titles. 

 boys' baseball (varsity) – 2015 & 2014 CHSAA City Champions 
 girls' basketball junior varsity and varsity team – 2019, 2017 and 2016 A Division New York City Archdiocesan Champions; three recent graduates were recruited to Division 1 women's basketball programs at Virginia Commonwealth University, Towson University and Providence College; former WNBA Los Angeles Sparks player Monique Coker also hails from Scanlan
 girls' softball
 boys' basketball – junior varsity 2019 Archdiocesan Champions  (freshman, junior varsity and varsity)
 girls' volleyball
 track
 cross country
 intramural sports

Notable alumni
 Jim Dietz –  Olympic silver medalist; National Rowing Hall of Fame
 Chris Gallagher – attorney;  Harvard University Hall of Fame
 Patrick Lynch – president, Patrolmen's Benevolent Association
 Dominic Massaro – New York Supreme Court Justice 
 Mike Nagy – former MLB player for the Boston Red Sox, St. Louis Cardinals, Texas Rangers, and Houston Astros
 Anne Gregory O'Connell – top rebounder in women's NCAA college hoops history with 1,999 rebounds; pre-NCAA record still stands today
 George A. Romero – filmmaker, notably for creating the Night of the Living Dead film series
 Louie Vega – international DJ; 2018 Grammy Award winner (six-time nominee); producer; artist

References

External links
 Official website

Roman Catholic high schools in the Bronx
Educational institutions established in 1949
1949 establishments in New York City
Throggs Neck, Bronx